The Paddock Viaduct, also known as the Main Street Viaduct, is a reinforced concrete bridge spanning the Trinity River in Fort Worth, Texas. Low-water crossings and ferries originally provided the only access across the Trinity River at this location, connecting the downtown area of Fort Worth with northern sections of the city. A two-lane suspension bridge, constructed near this site in the 1890s, proved inadequate for the growing population. This span, designed by the St. Louis engineering firm of Brenneke and Fay, was completed in 1914. It was the first reinforced concrete arch in the nation to use self-supporting, reinforcing steel. The bridge is named in honor of B. B. Paddock, former State Legislator and Mayor of the City (1980).

The bridge was built in 1913 and renovated in 1965 and 1988. It was added to the National Register of Historic Places on March 15, 1976.

Photo gallery

See also

List of bridges documented by the Historic American Engineering Record in Texas
National Register of Historic Places listings in Tarrant County, Texas

References

External links

Historic American Engineering Record in Texas
National Register of Historic Places in Fort Worth, Texas
Viaducts in the United States
Transportation buildings and structures in Fort Worth, Texas
Recorded Texas Historic Landmarks
Open-spandrel deck arch bridges in the United States
Concrete bridges in the United States
Road bridges in Texas